Suleputer (セルピュータ) is a record label the Japanese game development company Capcom uses for its releases. Its name derives from the full name of Capcom: "(CAP)(SULE) (COM)(PUTER)(S)".

Discography
Biohazard 2 ReMIX ~met@morPhoses~ (1997)
Marvel vs. Capcom: Clash of Super Heroes Original Soundtrack (1998)
Biohazard 2 Original Soundtrack (1998)
Biohazard: Symphony Op. 91: Crime and Punishment (1998)
Biohazard 2 Complete Track (1998)
Biohazard Orchestra (1999)
Biohazard Code: Veronica Original Soundtrack (2000)
Great Mahou Daisakusen Original Soundtrack (2000)
Dino Crisis 2 Original Soundtrack (2000)
Biohazard Code: Veronica Complete Original Soundtrack (2001)
Capcom Music Generation Family Computer Soundtracks Rockman 1~6 (2002)
STREET FIGHTER Tribute Album (2003)
Dino Crisis 3 Original Soundtrack (2003)
Viewtiful Joe + Viewtiful Joe 2 Original Soundtrack (2004)
Rockman Zero Complete Game Music Collection: Rockman Zero 1-3 (2004)
Biohazard Sound Chronicle (2005)
Biohazard 4 Original Soundtrack (2005)
Gyakuten Saiban Yomigaeru Gyakuten Original Soundtrack (2005)
Makaimura Music Collection (2005)
Ōkami Original Soundtrack (2006)
Goku Makaimura Original Soundtrack (2006)
Breath of Fire Original Soundtrack Special Box (2006)
Ōkami Piano Arrange (2007)
Dead Rising Original Soundtrack (2007)
Gyakuten Saiban Tokubetsu Hōtei 2008 (2008)
Biohazard 5 Original Soundtrack (2009)
Ghost Trick Original Sound Track (2010)
E.X. Troopers The Bounded Soundtrack (2012)

External links
 Suleputer

See also
 List of record labels

Japanese record labels
Capcom